Kirill Setkin (born 13 March 1993) is a Russian slalom canoeist who has competed at the international level since 2009. 

He competes in the C1 category and he won a bronze medal in the C1 team event at the 2019 ICF Canoe Slalom World Championships in La Seu d'Urgell as well as a bronze medal in the same event at the 2019 European Canoe Slalom Championships in Pau. He is the U23 World Champion in the C1 team event from 2014 and the Junior World Champion in the C1 event from 2010.

In September 2012, Setkin was suspended from competition for six months, after he was found to have violated RUSADA anti-doping regulations.

World Cup individual podiums

References

External links

1993 births
Living people
Russian male canoeists
Medalists at the ICF Canoe Slalom World Championships